At the 1992 Summer Olympics in Barcelona, two events in synchronized swimming were contested, both for women only.

Two gold medals were awarded in solo synchronized swimming after a judge inadvertently entered the score of "8.7" instead of the intended "9.7" in the computerized scoring system for one of Sylvie Fréchette's figures. This error ultimately placed Fréchette second, leaving Kristen Babb-Sprague for the gold medal. Following an appeal FINA awarded Fréchette a gold medal, replacing her silver medal and leaving the two swimmers both with gold. This was the last time that solo synchronized swimming was included in the Olympic program before being replaced in favor of a team event.

Qualification Summary

Medal summary

Medal table

References
 

 
1992 Summer Olympics events
1992
1992 in synchronized swimming
Synchronised swimming competitions in Spain